Route 36 is an illegal after-hours lounge in La Paz, Bolivia, and, according to The Guardian, the world's first cocaine bar.  Although cocaine, an addictive stimulant derived from the coca plant, is illegal in Bolivia, political corruption and affordability of locally produced cocaine have resulted in Route 36 becoming a popular destination for thousands of drug tourists each year.  Many customers learn about the bar's existence through travel websites and by word of mouth promotion.  To avoid complaints from nearby business owners or residents, Route 36 does not operate in the same location for more than a few weeks at a time. Its location can only be found by word of mouth information.

References

Cocaine
Recreational drug tourism
Buildings and structures in La Paz
Nightclubs
Tourism in Bolivia
Drugs in Bolivia